Kelly Hall Tarn is a pool in Cumbria, England, to the west of Coniston Water. It is located about one km south-south-east of the village of Torver, on Torver Back Common.
Its name is said to be derived from a nearby building that has since disappeared. The location offers excellent views of the Old Man of Coniston.

References 

Lakes of the Lake District
South Lakeland District